The 2003 Challenge Cup was sponsored by Powergen and was held during the 2002–03 season. The final was held on Saturday 26 April 2003, at Millennium Stadium, Cardiff, UK. The game was won by Bradford Bulls who defeated Leeds Rhinos.

First round

Second round

Third round

Fourth round

Fifth round

Quarter-finals

Semi-finals

Final
Final Score: Bradford Bulls 22 - 20 Leeds Rhinos

Referee:  Russell Smith (Castleford)

Attendance: 71,212

Bradford Bulls team
Robbie Paul, Tevita Vaikona, Scott Naylor, Shontayne Hape, Lesley Vainikolo, Leon Pryce, Paul Deacon, Joe Vagana, James Lowes, Daniel Gartner, Lee Radford, Jamie Peacock, Mike Forshaw

Subs: Karl Pratt, Lee Gilmour, Rob Parker, Paul Anderson Coach: Brian Noble

Scorers

Tries: Robbie Paul, Tevita Vaikona, Jamie Peacock

Goals: Paul Deacon (5)

Leeds Rhinos team

Gary Connolly, Mark Calderwood, Chris McKenna, Keith Senior, Francis Cummins, Kevin Sinfield, Andrew Dunemann, Ryan Bailey, Matt Diskin, Barrie McDermott, Chev Walker, Matt Adamson, David Furner

Subs: Rob Burrow, Willie Poching, Danny Ward, Wayne McDonald Coach: Daryl Powell

Scorers

Tries: Gary Connolly, Chris McKenna, David Furner

Goals: Kevin Sinfield (4)

Man of the Match
The Lance Todd Trophy was awarded to Gary Connolly (Leeds).

Half time entertainment
Mis-Teeq performed at half time.

Television coverage
BBC Sport had live rights to the tournament in the United Kingdom from the fourth round onwards.

The matches shown live on the BBC were: Wakefield Trinity Wildcats 20–18 Castleford Tigers and Warrington Wolves 12-38 Bradford Bulls (R4); Leeds Rhinos 21–12 London Broncos and Wakefield Trinity Wildcats 12–22 Widnes Vikings (R5); Widnes Vikings 28–38 Bradford Bulls and Leeds Rhinos 41–18 Hull (QF); Leeds Rhinos 33–26 St Helens and Wigan Warriors 22–36 Bradford Bulls (SF); and Bradford Bulls 22–20 Leeds Rhinos (Final).

External links
 2003 Challenge Cup Final

References 

Challenge Cup
Bradford Bulls
Challenge Cup
Challenge Cup
2000s in Cardiff
2003 in Welsh rugby league